Jazz Jackrabbit is a series of platform games featuring the eponymous character, Jazz Jackrabbit, a green anthropomorphic hare, who fights with his nemesis, Devan Shell, in a science fiction parody of the fable, The Tortoise and the Hare. Created by Arjan Brussee and Cliff Bleszinski and developed by Epic Games, the series debuted on MS-DOS in 1994 with Jazz Jackrabbit. The series consists of two PC games and a handheld game.

Games

Jazz Jackrabbit (1994)

The first Jazz Jackrabbit game was developed and published by Epic MegaGames and released in 1994 for MS-DOS. Jazz had to rescue Carrotus princess Eva Earlong, who was kidnapped by his nemesis, Devan Shell. The shareware edition was extremely popular and the game was named Arcade Game of the Year by PC Format.

Jazz Jackrabbit 2 (1998)

Jazz Jackrabbit 2 was developed by Orange Games and Epic MegaGames, and published by Gathering of Developers in the United States, Project 2 Interactive in Europe and P&A in Japan. Jazz and his siblings, Spaz and Lori, attempt to retrieve Eva's stolen wedding ring from Devan. Despite moderate success in Europe, the game was a commercial failure for Gathering of Developers.

Jazz Jackrabbit 3

Jazz Jackrabbit 3 (alternatively called Jazz Jackrabbit 3D: Adventures of a Mean Green Hare) is the cancelled game of the series. Spearheaded by Dean "Noogy" Dodrill (an animator for Jazz Jackrabbit 2) and coded by World Tree Games, it was being developed for the original Unreal Engine technology in 1999. As the game's alternate name implies, it would have been rendered in 3D. The game was planned for release on PC and PlayStation 2.

Development of the game was ceased part way through in May 2000 as Epic Games was unable to find a publisher. Since then, the alpha has been leaked onto the internet. Spaz and Lori, both of whom were from the preceding game, were also intended to be playable, but only Jazz is playable in the alpha.

Following the events of Jazz Jackrabbit 2, Jazz Jackrabbit and Eva Earlong settle down in Carrotus Castle and become parents. Devan Shell kidnaps their children, taking them into an alternate universe via the time machine from the previous game.

Jazz Jackrabbit 3 is a third-person shooter with platforming and adventure game elements. The mouse is used to aim and shoot, while the keyboard moves Jazz around the world. Jazz can fire his weapon, or charge up a more powerful shot. Jazz's arsenal can be expanded using coins collected to purchase new weapons and combine them with Elemental "Dream Cells" to create various weapon effects. In the alpha, only Fire and Ice Dream Cells can be acquired, and usable with two guns (the standard Blaster and the Gizmo Gun). 

Unlike the previous installments, Jazz Jackrabbit 3 has no levels. Instead, it is divided into sections, similar to Super Metroid. At specific points in a map, the player can travel back and forth between these sections. Each new area that is visited is prefaced by its name.

Jazz Jackrabbit (2002)

Jazz Jackrabbit, developed by Game Titan and published by Jaleco under license from Epic Games, was released for the Game Boy Advance in 2002. As a reboot to the series, several changes were done in overall design, oriented towards cosmic science fiction inspired by Star Wars. Jazz was redesigned to resemble Han Solo. Eva and Lori are missing from the game while Devan Shell has been replaced by Dark Shell.

Other appearances
Jazz, Devan and Eva make guest appearances in One Must Fall: 2097 in single-player tournament mode. Each character pilots a fighting mech that is suited to their individual personalities.

At one point, Epic MegaGames was considering an animated series based on Jazz Jackrabbit, as evidenced by Epic filing a trademark registration for the name "Jazz Jackrabbit" on March 28, 1997. The application contains a description for goods and services which says "entertainment in the nature of animated TV series".

In December 2010, Epic Games released development kits for the Unreal Engine on iOS. One of the tutorials for these devkits features Jazz Jackrabbit as a top down twin-stick shooter game.

A Jazz Jackrabbit easter egg appears in Fortnite.

References

External links 

  Jazz Jackrabbit Series at MobyGames
 

 
Video game franchises
Video game franchises introduced in 1994
The Tortoise and the Hare